NRB Bank is one of the third generation private banks in Bangladesh. Mohammed Mahtabur Rahman, chairman of Al Haramain Perfumes, is the chairman of the NRB Bank. Mohammed Jamil Iqbal and Tateyama Kabir are vice-chairmen of the NRB Bank. Mehmood Husain is the CEO and Managing Director of NRB Bank.

History 
Migrants Bangladeshis were demanding such type of bank since 1990s. However, Md. Bayazid Sarker an economist and Central Bank official of Bangladesh first develop a theoretical structure of the bank and officially floated the idea in his research paper titled "Alternative Resource of World Bank for External Financing in Bangladesh: A Foreign Remittance Approach" on 15 December 2007 in Dhaka. Bangladesh Bank called for NRB bank applications in 2011 and finally issued three NRB Bank (Non-resident Bangladeshis Bank) licenses in 2013; the NRB Banks are NRB Commercial Bank Limited, NRB Bank Limited and NRB Global Bank Limited. There is no differences between the operations of a regular bank and a NRB bank.

In 2014, NRB Bank provided a loan to Mohammad Shahed, Chairman of Regent Hospital, without proper collateral. Anti-Corruption Commission filled two cases over the loans in 2020 against Shahed and bank officials.

In May 2015, Bangladesh Bank provided NRB Bank permission to operate agent banking.

Md Mehmood Husain was appointed Managing Director of NRB Bank on 1 August 2016.

Md Mukhter Hossain, CEO and Managing Director of NRB Commercial Bank, was appointed an advisor to NRB Bank on 5 May 2021.

In September 2021, a special internal audit of NRB Bank found that the bank engaged in "unethical" investments in the stock marketing causing harm to both the bank, a loss of 1.03 billion taka, and the stock market. Bangladesh Bank finned the bank 4.9 million taka over the investments and market manipulation. Chief financial officer of NBR Bank was terminated. It also announced plans in September 2021 it's intention to start an IPO soon. On 27 September 2021, the Anti-Corruption Commission filed charges against M Badiuzzaman, Director of NRB Bank, and his wife for allegedly embezzling 25.3 million taka from the bank.

In November 2021, Bangladesh Securities and Exchange Commission began an investigation into the activities of NRB Bank.

References 

Banks of Bangladesh
Banks established in 2013
2013 establishments in Bangladesh